Gennadi Valentinovich Filimonov (born 21 September 1962) is a former Russian professional footballer.

Club career
He made his professional debut in the Soviet Second League in 1984 for FC Arsenal Tula.

Honours
 Russian Cup winner: 1993.

European club competitions
With FC Torpedo Moscow.

 UEFA Cup 1992–93: 4 games.
 UEFA Cup 1993–94: 1 game.

References

1962 births
Living people
Soviet footballers
Russian footballers
Association football midfielders
Association football defenders
FC Chernomorets Novorossiysk players
FC Lokomotiv Moscow players
FC Torpedo Moscow players
FC Torpedo-2 players
FC Metallurg Lipetsk players
FC Volgar Astrakhan players
FC Arsenal Tula players
Russian Premier League players
FC Irtysh Omsk players
FC Volga Ulyanovsk players